The 1923 Cork Intermediate Hurling Championship was the 14th staging of the Cork Intermediate Hurling Championship since its establishment by the Cork County Board.

Mallow won the championship following a 2-2 to 2-1 defeat of Evergreen in the final.

Results

Final

References

Cork Intermediate Hurling Championship
Cork Intermediate Hurling Championship